Buddyprisen (established 1956 in Oslo, Norway) is an award, given annually by the Norwegian Jazz Forum to a Norwegian jazz musician that has "been an excellent performer and significantly involved in Norwegian jazz by other means".

The award was accompanied by a statue portraiting the New Orleans trumpeter Buddy Bolden, made by visual artist Lise Frogg. From 1987, recipients have received a travel grant; in 2011, the grant amounted to NKR 50,000.

The awards ceremony takes place at the club "Bare Jazz" in Oslo.

In 2009, the prize was awarded at "Dokkhuset" in Trondheim.

List of Buddy Award winners 

1956: Rowland Greenberg
1957: Arvid Gram Paulsen
1958: Einar Iversen
1959: –
1960: Mikkel Flagstad
1961: Erik Amundsen
1962: Bjørn Johansen
1963: –
1964: Øistein Ringstad
1965: Karin Krog
1966: –
1967: Jon Christensen
1968: Jan Garbarek
1969: Arild Andersen
1970: Frode Thingnæs
1971: Carl Magnus Neumann
1972: Asmund Bjørken
1973: –
1974: –
1975: Bjørn Alterhaug
1976: Laila Dalseth
1977: Egil Kapstad
1978: Kristian Bergheim
1979: Guttorm Guttormsen
1980: Bjarne Nerem
1981: Knut Riisnæs
1982: Radka Toneff
1983: Terje Bjørklund – Knut Kristiansen – Espen Rud
1984: Jon Balke
1985: Terje Rypdal
1986: Thorgeir Stubø
1987: Tore Jensen
1988: Carl Morten Iversen – Terje Venaas
1989: Per Husby
1990: John Pål Inderberg
1991: Stein Erik Tafjord
1992: Morten Gunnar Larsen
1993: Egil Johansen
1994: Bjørn Kjellemyr
1995: Per Jørgensen
1996: –
1997: Ole Jacob Hansen
1998: Magni Wentzel
1999: Totti Bergh
2000: Sidsel Endresen
2001: Jon Eberson
2002: –
2003: Nils Petter Molvær
2003: Honorary Award Buddy to Petter Pettersson
2004: Bugge Wesseltoft
2005: Arve Henriksen
2006: Paal Nilssen-Love
2007: Jon Larsen
2008: Frode Gjerstad
2009: Dag Arnesen
2010: Karl Seglem
2011: Eldbjørg Raknes
2012: Tore Brunborg
2013: Jan Gunnar Hoff
2014: Erlend Skomsvoll
2015: Håkon Kornstad
2016: Live Maria Roggen
2017: Audun Kleive
2018: Ingebrigt Håker Flaten
2019: Ståle Storløkken

See also
 Music award

References

External links 
Buddy - Norsk Jazzforum

1956 establishments in Norway
Awards established in 1956
Jazz awards
Norwegian jazz
Norwegian music awards